Harley Bonner (born 27 April 1991) is an Australian actor known for his roles as Josh Willis on Neighbours (2013–2016) and Logan Bennett on Home and Away (2021–2022).

Early life
Bonner was born in Melbourne and lived in Belgrave, Victoria. He is the son of actress Carla Bonner and has a younger brother.

Career
Bonner had a guest role in House Husbands in 2012 and appeared in the documentary series Creative Kids in 2014. He joined the cast of Neighbours as Josh Willis in 2013. He admitted that when he started acting, he did not want to appear in Neighbours, as his mother had played Stephanie Scully in the show for 11 years and he did not want "a free ride" because of that.

In March 2021, Bonner joined the cast of Home and Away as Dr. Logan Bennett. He made his debut in August 2021. On 8 January 2022, it was announced that Bonner had left the serial and would not return to set when filming resumes, as he had not received a COVID-19 vaccine; Seven Network requires all staff working on their productions to be vaccinated. Bonner's last scenes as Logan aired on 6 June 2022.

Personal life
Bonner has been in a relationship with model Natalie Roser since 2017.  They announced their engagement in November 2021, and married on 18 February 2022 at the Krinklewood Estate in New South Wales.

Filmography

References

External links

Male actors from Brisbane
Living people
1991 births
21st-century Australian male actors
Australian male soap opera actors
People from Yarra Ranges
Male actors from Melbourne